Area code 506 is the telephone area code in the North American Numbering Plan (NANP) for the Canadian province of New Brunswick. The area code was created in 1955 in a split of numbering plan area (NPA) 902.

History
The Maritimes provinces (New Brunswick, Nova Scotia, Prince Edward Island) were designated as a single numbering plan area (NPA) in 1947, when the American Telephone and Telegraph Company (AT&T) published the results of the design of a new telephone numbering plan for the North American continent, that unified all existing local numbering system into what would later develop into the North American Numbering Plan, with the goal of automating the expanding toll call routing that involved many telephone operators manually relaying calls across the nations. Of the set of eighty-six original North American area codes, Canada received nine, in which the Maritimes were represented by area code 902. 

After the addition of Newfoundland in 1949, New Brunswick and Newfoundland were split off from the numbering plan area in 1955  with area code 506. This configuration existed only until 1962, when Newfoundland was assigned area code 709, leaving New Brunswick as a distinct numbering plan area, with area code 506. Since this persists until today without any overlay code, seven-digit dialing will remain possible in New Brunswick, along with numbering plan areas 709, 807, and 867 in Canada, through early 2023.

Area code 506 was expected to face numbering exhaustion in 2020, and was to be overlaid with area code 428, beginning November 21, 2020, with permissive ten-digit dialing to start in May 2020. Later, the projected exhaust date was delayed to April 2023 and the implementation date was postponed to April 23, 2022. However, the projected exhaust date was delayed to December 2023 and the implementation date had therefore been postponed to April 29, 2023.

The incumbent local exchange carrier for area code 506 is Bell Aliant, which was produced from a merger that included NBTel. Since 2005, local telephone service through Eastlink Communications has also been available in the town of Sackville.

Rate centres and central offices 

 Premium numbers: (1-506) - 976
 Albert: (506) - 882
 Allardville: (506) - 583 725
 Alma: (506) - 887
 Baie-Sainte-Anne: (506) - 228
 Baker Brook: (506) - 258 822
 Balmoral: (506) - 509 826
 Bathurst: (506) - 226 252 255 265 350 416 480 499 500 513 541 543 544 545 546 547 548 549 655 984 989
 Belledune: (506) - 237 507 520 522
 Blacks Harbour: (506) - 456 816
 Blackville: (506) - 586 790 843
 Boiestown: (506) - 369
 Bouctouche: (506) - 291 341 700 743 744 926 955
 Browns Flat: (506) - 468 571
 Campbellton: (506) - 248 329 701 753 759 760 787 789 790 929 987
 Campobello Island: (506) - 752
 Cap-Pelé: (506) - 332 577
 Caraquet: (506) - 201 602 702 720 724 726 727 997
 Chipman: (506) - 339 820
 Clair: (506) - 401 821 992
 Cocagne: (506) - 345 576
 Dalhousie: (506) - 239 508 684 685 686 706
 Deer Island: (506) - 747
 Doaktown: (506) - 225 309 361 365 906 924
 Dorchester: (506) - 213 224 379 966
 Edmundston: (506) - 200 223 253 254 353 419 501 514 733 735 736 737 739 740 838 880 986 996
 Florenceville: (506) - 221 245 246 276 278 391 392 595 703 928
 Fords Mills: (506) - 785
 Fredericton: (506) - 206 230 238 247 259 260 261 262 267 292 300 415 429 440 442 443 444 447 449 450 451 452 453 454 455 457 458 459 460 461 462 470 471 472 474 476 478 515 516 897 981 998 999
 Fredericton Junction: (506) - 348 368
 Gagetown: (506) - 488
 Grand Bay–Westfield: (506) - 217 270 738 757
 Grand Falls: (506) - 240 426 473 475 477 479 481 582 704 995
 Grand Manan: (506) - 660 661 662
 Grande-Anse: (506) - 604 732
 Hampton: (506) - 832 943
 Hartland: (506) - 375 596
 Harvey: (506) - 347 366 370 705
 Hillsborough: (506) - 203 734
 Hoyt: (506) - 687
 Kedgwick: (506) - 283 284 505
 Keswick Ridge: (506) - 209 363
 Lamèque: (506) - 344 599
 Maces Bay: (506) - 659
 McAdam: (506) - 590 784
 Meductic: (506) - 272 279 812 894
 Memramcook: (506) - 334 758
 Millville: (506) - 463
 Minto: (506) - 326 327 817
 Miramichi: (506) - 210 251 264 352 417 424 502 517 622 623 624 625 626 627 773 778 780 836 983 985 993
 Moncton: (506) - 204 227 229 232 233 268 294 295 314 377 378 380 381 382 383 384 386 387 388 389 414 431 518 588 777 800 801 802 803 804 805 806 807 830 850 851 852 853 854 855 856 857 858 859 860 861 862 863 864 866 867 869 870 871 872 874 875 877 878 893 899 961 962 980 988
 Nackawic: (506) - 575 818
 Neguac: (506) - 220 330 776 779 969
 New Denmark: (506) - 553 825
 Norton: (506) - 570 839
 Oromocto: (506) - 208 357 385 422 446
 Paquetville: (506) - 603 764
 Perth-Andover: (506) - 273 274 280 707 819
 Petitcodiac: (506) - 331 534 708 750 751 756
 Petit-Rocher: (506) - 430 542 783
 Plaster Rock: (506) - 219 355 356 359 968
 Port Elgin: (506) - 205 538
 Richibucto: (506) - 212 338 427 521 523 524 709 920
 Riverside-Albert: (506) - 882
 Rogersville: (506) - 346 775
 Rothesay: (506) - 216 847 848 849
 Sackville: (506) - 256 360 364 536 540 710 939 940
 Saint-Antoine: (506) - 342 525
 Saint-Basile: (506) - 263 580
 Saint-Isidore: (506) - 358 598
 Saint-Léonard: (506) - 390 421 423 824
 Saint-Louis-de-Kent: (506) - 335 876
 Saint-Quentin: (506) - 234 235 241 400 504
 Sainte-Anne-de-Madawaska: (506) - 445 823
 Saint John: (506) - 202 214 266 285 288 298 333 343 349 420 519 557 558 565 566 592 607 608 609 631 632 633 634 635 636 637 638 639 640 642 643 644 645 646 647 648 649 650 651 652 653 654 657 658 659 663 672 674 692 693 694 696 717 719 721 798 799 844 845 846 886 898 948 977 978 982
 Salisbury: (506) - 215 372
 Shediac: (506) - 236 312 351 530 531 532 533 712 922
 Shippagan: (506) - 218 242 336 337 340 601 715 925
 Springfield, Kings County: (506) - 485
 Stanley: (506) - 367
 St. Andrews: (506) - 529 814
 St. George: (506) - 222 396 713 754 755 815 923
 St. Martins: (506) - 833
 St. Stephen: (506) - 249 321 465 466 467 469 573 714 813 921 927
 Summerville (Kingston Peninsula): (506) - 763
 Sussex: (506) - 432 433 434 435 512 567 808 944 979 994
 Tracadie: (506) - 250 393 394 395 397 399 600 716 888
 Welsford: (506) - 486
 Woodstock: (506) - 243 277 323 324 325 328 425 503 594 612 991
 Youngs Cove: (506) - 362

See also 

 Telephone numbers in Canada
 Canadian Numbering Administration Consortium

References

External links 
 CNA exchange list for area +1-506
 Telecom archives
 Area Code Map of Canada

506
Area codes
Area codes
1955 establishments in New Brunswick